This is a list of lighthouses in Comoros.

Lighthouses

See also
 Lists of lighthouses and lightvessels

References

Comoros
Lighthouses
Lighthouses